The 2021 Sardegna Open was a tennis tournament on the 2021 ATP Tour. It was played on outdoor clay courts in Cagliari, Sardinia, Italy. It was organised with a single-year licence in 2021, and was held at Tennis Club Cagliari from April 5 to 11, 2021.

The Italian 250 debuted October 2020 as a response to the COVID-19 pandemic to increase earning opportunities for players. It returned to Sardegna in 2021 and opened the red-clay season in Europe. SuperTennis is the official broadcast network for the event.

Champions

Singles

  Lorenzo Sonego def.  Laslo Đere, 2–6, 7–6(7–5), 6–4

Doubles

  Lorenzo Sonego /  Andrea Vavassori def.  Simone Bolelli /  Andrés Molteni, 6–3, 6–4

Points and prize money

Point distribution

Prize money 

*per team

Singles main-draw entrants

Seeds

1 Rankings are as of March 22, 2021

Other entrants
The following players received wildcards into the main draw:
  Federico Gaio
  Thomas Fabbiano
  Giulio Zeppieri

The following players received entry from the qualifying draw:
  Liam Broady
  Marc-Andrea Hüsler
  Jozef Kovalík
  Sumit Nagal

Withdrawals 
Before the tournament
  Jérémy Chardy → replaced by  João Sousa
  Cristian Garín → replaced by  Federico Coria
  Aslan Karatsev → replaced by  Lorenzo Musetti
  Thiago Monteiro → replaced by  Andrej Martin
  Fernando Verdasco → replaced by  Yannick Hanfmann

Doubles main-draw entrants

Seeds

 Rankings are as of March 22, 2021.

Other entrants
The following pairs received wildcards into the doubles main draw:
  Jacopo Berrettini /  Matteo Berrettini
  Andrea Pellegrino /  Giulio Zeppieri

The following pair received entry using a protected ranking:
  Roman Jebavý /  Igor Zelenay

Withdrawals 
Before the tournament
  Rajeev Ram /  Joe Salisbury → replaced by  Harri Heliövaara /  Denys Molchanov
  Jonny O'Mara /  Ken Skupski → replaced by  Lloyd Glasspool /  Jonny O'Mara
During the tournament
  Dan Evans /  Federico Coria

References

External links

Sardegna Open
Sardegna Open
Sardegna Open
Sardegna Open